Xanthonymus xanthioides, the littler largest dart, is a species of butterfly in the family Hesperiidae. It is found in Nigeria (the Cross River loop), Cameroon, Gabon and the Republic of the Congo. The habitat consists of forests.

References

Butterflies described in 1892
Hesperiinae
Butterflies of Africa